The UIC Building (United Industrial Corporation Limited Building) was a former 40-storey,  skyscraper in the city-state of Singapore.

History
The tower was completed in 1973, and it was the 39th-tallest building in Singapore, tied in rank with Chevron House, Meritus Mandarin Singapore Tower Two, and One Marina Boulevard. At the time of its 1973 completion, the UIC Building was the tallest structure in the city-state and one of the tallest buildings in Southeast Asia. It retained the former title for only one year, as the  United Overseas Bank Plaza Two was completed in 1974. The building was renovated in 1986 and was given a new concrete facade in the Brutalist style of architecture.

In 2007, United Industrial Corporation, under a collective sale, bought the 21.2 per cent of the UIC Building that it did not already own in order for a redevelopment.

In 2012, during demolition works of the building, part of the building gave way and collapsed, causing injuries to a worker.

Demolition work had been completed in 2013. A new development by United Industrial Corporation which includes a mix of residential and commercial units known as V on Shenton (Five on Shenton) was started on its former site and was completed in 2017.

See also
 List of tallest buildings in Singapore
 List of tallest voluntarily demolished buildings

References

1973 establishments in Singapore
2013 disestablishments in Singapore
Office buildings completed in 1973
Buildings and structures demolished in 2013
Skyscraper office buildings in Singapore
Former skyscrapers
Demolished buildings and structures in Singapore
20th-century architecture in Singapore